C4, C04, C.IV, C-4, or C-04 may refer to:

Places
 Caldwell 4 or NGC 7023 or Iris Nebula, a reflection nebula in the constellation Cepheus
 Circumferential Road 4 or C-4, an arterial road of Manila, Philippines
 Ken-Ō Expressway (includes some sections of Shin-Shōnan Bypass), route C4 in Japan
Omotesandō Station, a Tokyo Metro subway station (station numbers C-04, G-02, H-02)

People
 C4 (rapper), a rap music producer from Birmingham, England
 Clarence Mitchell IV, American radio host and former politician
 Chris Turner, sometimes credited as Chris Heiner, a.k.a. "C4", Australian musician, part of Modern Day Poets (MDP) alongside Tim Turner (a.k.a. "DubLT") and Joel Turner

Computing 
C4 (conference), a Macintosh software developers conference
 C4 Engine, a next-generation 3D game engine
 C4 model (software), a graphical notation technique for diagramming software architecture
 Cx4 chip, an add-on microprocessor chip employed by certain Super NES game cartridges (often incorrectly referred to as the C4 chip)
 Controlled collapse chip connection or flip chip, a method for interconnecting semiconductor devices
 VIA C4, a planned design of central processing unit for a personal computer

Arts, entertainment, and media

Music
 C4 (American band), a neo-classical metal band set up by Michael Angelo Batio
 C4 (French band), French boyband  
 C4 (mixtape), mixtape by American rapper Kendrick Lamar
 C4, scientific pitch notation for the note "Middle C" (261.626 Hz)
 C4 Records, a record label
 Tha Carter IV, album by American rapper Lil Wayne

Other uses in arts, entertainment and media
 C4 (New Zealand TV channel), a former New Zealand television music channel
 1. c4, also called the English Opening, a chess opening
 Channel 4, a UK television channel broadcasting since 1982

Mathematics, science, and technology

Biology
 C4: an EEG electrode site according to the 10-20 system
 Apolipoprotein C4, a protein encoded by the APOC4 gene 
 c4 antisense RNA, a non-coding RNA
 ATC code C04 Peripheral vasodilators, a subgroup of the Anatomical Therapeutic Chemical Classification System
 C4 carbon fixation, a pathway for carbon fixation in photosynthesis that produces C4 plants
 Cervical spinal nerve 4, a nerve originating in the neck
 Cervical vertebra 4, one of the cervical vertebrae of the vertebral column
 C04, oral cancer ICD-10 code
Complement component 4, a protein involved in the intricate complement system
C4 fragments, one of the types of products of catabolism pathways

Math
 , the cyclic group of order 4
 C4, the fourth pure "core" module in the Edexcel A-level mathematics examination

Other uses in science and technology
 C4, butyl-type hydrocarbon chain, a type of four-carbon molecule, especially in C4 reversed-phase chromatography columns
 Cluster 4 or Tango, an ESA satellite that studies the Earth's magnetosphere over the course of an entire solar cycle

Organizations
 C4 (Colombia), a political party in Colombia
 C4, a social welfare non-profit entity organized under section 501(c)(4) of the U.S. Internal Revenue Code
 Churches Covered and Connected in Covenant, a religious association founded by Archbishop LeRoy Bailey Jr.
Craiova Group a cooperation project of four European states – Romania, Bulgaria, Greece and Serbia – for the purposes of furthering their European integration as well as economic, transport and energy cooperation with one another.

Sports 
 C4 (classification), a Paralympic cycling classification
 C-4, professional wrestler Paul Burchill's name for his finishing move, a moonsault uranage
 C4, an abbreviation for a four-man Sprint Canoe, see Canoe racing
 C4, a term used to refer to the UEFA Intertoto Cup, a football competition (mainly used in non-English speaking countries)
 C4 level, a challenge square dance program at the Challenge 4 level

Stationery 
 C4, an international standard paper size (229 × 324 mm), defined in ISO 216
 C4, the envelope size matching the A4 paper size

Vehicles

Aircraft
 C-4, the US Army designation of the Ford Trimotor
 AEG C.IV, a German World War I reconnaissance aircraft
 AGO C.IV, a 1917 German reconnaissance aircraft
 C-4 Academe, the military version of Gulfstream I twin turboprop business aircraft
 C-4 Argonaut, a Canadair aircraft derived from the Douglas DC-4
 Cierva C.4, a 1922 Spanish experimental autogyro
 DFW C.IV, a 1916 German reconnaissance aircraft
 Flight Design C4, a four-seat light aircraft
 Fokker C.IV, a 1923 Dutch two-seat reconnaissance aircraft
 Rumpler C.IV, a 1917 German single-engine, two-seater reconnaissance biplane

Automobiles
 C4, a class of Audi 100 and Audi A6 cars
 Chevrolet Corvette C4, the fourth production design of the Chevrolet Corvette
 Citroën C4, a car made by Citroën
 Coloni C4, a Formula One car built by Enzo Coloni Racing Car Systems
 Sauber C4, a Sauber sportscar
 Spyker C4, a Spyker car

Locomotives
 Bavarian C IV, an 1884 German steam locomotive
 GS&WR Class C4, a Great Southern and Western Railway Irish steam locomotive
 LNER Class C4, a class of British steam locomotives

Ships
 HMS C4, a British C class submarine of the Royal Navy
 Type C4 ship, merchant cargo ships of United States Maritime Commission "C" design
 USS C-4 (SS-15), a United States C class submarine of the United States Navy
 USS Philadelphia (C-4), a protected cruiser of the United States Navy

Vehicle components
 Ford C4 transmission, an automatic transmission
 Menasco C4, a 1930s 4-cylinder, air-cooled, in-line, inverted, aero-engine

Weapons
 C-4 (explosive), a type of plastic explosive
 Hafdasa C-4, an Argentine submachine gun

Other uses 
 C4, a variation of Command and control, meaning "Command, Control, Communications and Computers"
 C4, the monogram of Christian IV of Denmark, used in the city arms of Kristianstad, Sweden since 1622
 C4 Extreme, a sports nutrition supplement product line by Cellucor

See also 

 4C (disambiguation)
 CCCC (disambiguation)
 CIV (disambiguation)